Phoenix National and Literary Society was a society formed by members of the Young Ireland movement in Dublin, Ireland. It was established in 1856 by Jeremiah O'Donovan Rossa "for the liberation of Ireland by force of arms". The society's aim was to encourage intellectuals to become nationalists and vice versa as well as to encourage a revival of Irish culture. It later merged with the Irish Republican Brotherhood.

In one of his writings, O'Donovan describes the origin of the society's name; "I remember the night we met to give it a name. Some proposed that it be called the Emmet Monument Association, others proposed other names. I proposed that it be called the Phoenix National and Literary Society — the word Phoenix signifying that the Irish cause was again to rise from the ashes of our martyred nationality. My resolution was carried, and that is how the word Phoenix comes into Irish national history."

Jeremiah O'Donovan Rossa died in 1915. His grave can be found in Glasnevin Cemetery, Dublin. A quote on the tomb reads, "... but the fools, the fools, the fools! They have left us Fenian dead and while Ireland holds these graves, Ireland unfree shall never be at peace."

References

Further reading
R. Rees - 18th Century Ireland

History of Ireland (1801–1923)
Irish republican organisations